Edith Bateson (1867–1938) was a British painter and sculptor.

Biography
Bateson was born in Cambridge and studied painting and sculpture at the Royal Academy Schools in London, where she won a number of prizes. Living in Bushey in Hertfordshire, then for a time at Robin Hood's Bay in Yorkshire,  Bateson created statuettes and small groups of figures in bronze. From 1891 to 1935 she was a regular exhibitor in group exhibitions in London and Paris. In London she mainly showed works at the Royal Academy, with the International Society of Sculptors, Painters and Gravers and the Royal Society of British Artists while in Paris she exhibited at the Salon des Artistes Francais.

References

External links

1867 births
1938 deaths
19th-century English women artists
20th-century English women artists
Alumni of the Royal Academy Schools
Artists from Cambridge
English women sculptors